Baladeh or Bala Deh may refer to:
 Baladeh, Fars, a city in Fars Province, Iran
 Bala Deh, Larestan, a village in Fars Province, Iran
 Bala Deh, Gilan, a village in Talesh County, Gilan Province, Iran
 Bala Deh, Hamadan, a village in Nahavand County, Hamadan Province, Iran
 Baladeh, Mazandaran, a city in Mazandaran Province, Iran
 Baladeh-ye Kojur, a village in Mazandaran Province, Iran
 Bala Deh, Mazandaran, a village in Mazandaran Province, Iran
 Baladeh, Tonekabon, a village in Mazandaran Province, Iran
 Baladeh District, an administrative subdivision of Mazandaran Province, Iran
 Baladeh, North Khorasan, a village in Bojnord County, North Khorasan Province, Iran
 Baladeh Rural District (disambiguation)